The Château de Puybardeau is a château or country house in Lignerolles, a small town and commune in the Indre département of France.

It was built in the 19th century by the de Maussabré family. It was used by the French Resistance during World War II.

Notes and references

See also
 Heugnes

Houses completed in the 19th century
Châteaux in Indre
French Resistance
19th-century architecture in France